Hungate can refer to several people and places:

Places:
 Hungate, Lancashire, a location
 Hungate, Leicestershire, a location
 Hungate, Norwich
 Hungate, West Yorkshire, a location
 Hungate, Winchester
 Hungate (York), a street and surrounding area
Emneth Hungate

People:
 David Hungate
 William L. Hungate
 Matthew Hungate
 Robert Hungate
 Thomas Hungate
 Dick Hungate

Other:
Hungate massacre, the murder of the Hungate family on June 11, 1864.